Parc Erissey is a hamlet north of Redruth, Cornwall, England.

References

Hamlets in Cornwall